Salah Benlemqawanssa (born June 28, 1979), also known as Salah the Entertainer and Spider Salah, is a competitive hip-hop dancer from France who won the inaugural season of La France a un incroyable talent (France has Incredible Talent), the fourth season of Arabs Got Talent and the fourth season of Tú Sí Que Vales (Italy). He was born in the Paris suburb Saint-Denis and is of Moroccan (Father) and Algerian (Mother) ancestry. He calls his personal dance style P.A.B.E. which stands for Popping, Animation, Boogaloo, and Effects. Although Salah is best known for popping, he is also skilled in b-boying.

Career 
Salah started dancing in 1996 after he saw the dance crew O Posse practicing their moves in front of the mirrors of the Théâtre national de Chaillot. Two years later, he and his crew The Family won second place at the international b-boying competition Battle of the Year (BOTY) in 1998. In 1999, he joined the contemporary dance company Montalvo-Hervieu.

In 2006, Salah won the first season of Incroyable Talent. In 2007, he performed a one-man stage show at London-based Breakin' Convention called "The Dream of Gluby". In 2008, he starred as himself in Beats Per Minute, an independent film about a French popper who discovers he can rewind time with his dance moves. In 2009, Salah served as a judge at BOTY's international one-on-one b-boy battle in Germany. BOTY is a b-boy competition exclusively for b-boy crews; however, to celebrate their 20th anniversary they had a competition for b-boy solo dancers.

In 2011, Salah led a digital project called Breathe the Beat. Through Breathe the Beat, he released a series of five video tutorials explaining how he takes inspiration from the world around him to create his P.A.B.E. dance style. He also judged an online competition based on the principles of his tutorials to see which dancer could create the best one-minute performance. The winner, chosen by Salah, that created the best routine was James "AnimatedJ" Jimenez from the USA. The project also featured a series of roadshows around the UK taught by Brooke and Roxy from Funkstylerz and Plague dance crews. After Breath the Beat, Salah toured North America from October 2011 to October 2012 as a featured dancer in Cirque du Soleil's production Michael Jackson: The Immortal World Tour.

In 2013, Salah became a brand ambassador for Puma. Through this partnership, Puma launched a dance project called "Puma the Quest" that gave five dancers the opportunity to travel the world and be personally mentored by Salah. The street dancers were chosen from hundreds of video submissions which were narrowed down to a core group of 20. The core group had to perform live in front of a panel of judges including singer Nawell Madani, rapper Youssoupha, and Salah himself. The five winners—Lara Laquiz, Tiet Sofian, Steph 2SL, Anto, and b-boy Ska—were announced the following day at the Juste Debout 2013 finals. They traveled with Salah to New York City, Berlin, Tokyo, Paris, London, and Los Angeles to learn about the street culture within each city. When they returned to Paris they created a show about their experience around the world.

In December 2013, Salah appeared on La France a un incroyable talent again in a one-time special called La Finale des Champions (The Finale of Champions). Three months later in March 2014, Salah served as a judge on the Canal J kids television show Battle Dance with singer Sherefa Luna and b-boy Ali "Lilou" Ramdani. In 2015, Salah won the fourth season of Arabs Got Talent.

Titles 

Tú Sí Que Vales (Italy)
2017: Winner
Arabs Got Talent
2015: Winner
Last One Stands
2014: 1-on-1 Popping champion
DANCE@LIVE WORLDCUP
2014: 1-on-1 Freestyle champion
2018: 1-on-1 Freestyle championRed Bull Beat It2012: 1-on-1 Freestyle championUK B-Boy Championships2016: 1-on-1 Popping champion
2010: B-boy crew champions
2007: 1-on-1 Popping championFunkin' Styles2010: 1-on-1 Freestyle champion
2009: 1-on-1 Freestyle champion
2006: 1-on-1 Freestyle championPopping Professional battle Japan 2007: 1-on-1 Popping championEuroBattle2008: 1-on-1 Popping champion
2006: 1-on-1 Popping championJuste Debout2006: 2-on-2 Popping champions - Salah & Iron Mike
2004: 2-on-2 Popping champions - Salah & Damon FrostIncroyable Talent2006: WinnerThe Notorious IBE2005: Stand Up Dance Battle champion
2003: Stand Up Dance Battle champion
2002: Seven 2 Smoke championUrban Momentum2004: 1-on-1 Freestyle championB-Boy Showdown1998: 1-on-1 Popping championFreeStylez Seesion Korea2004: 1-on-1 Freestyle champion

 Appearances Television2017: Tú Sí Que Vales
2016: Das Supertalent
2015: Arabs Got Talent
2014: Battle Dance
2013: La France a un Incroyable Talent
2009: Star King
2006: Incroyable TalentJudging2013: All India Dance Competition
2013: The Notorious IBE
2013: R16
2009: BOTY
2009: Red Bull BC One
2008: UK B-Boy ChampionshipsHe judged the locking and popping competitions only.
2008: Warsaw Challenge
2007: Warsaw Challenge 
2006: Circle SensationFilm2014: Mad About Dance
2012: Sur la piste du Marsupilami
2008: Beats Per Minute
2002: Astérix et Obélix: Mission CléopâtreMusic Video1996: "Super Discount" - Etienne de Crecy
2006: "Rudebox" - Robbie Williams
2005: "Feel The Vibe" - Axwell
2005: "Doo Wap" - Paul Johnson Feat. ChynnaStage2011: Michael Jackson: The Immortal World Tour
2009: Breakin' Convention
2008: Freestyle Session
2008: Urban Dance Showcase
2007: Rencontres de la Villette
2007: Breakin' Convention
2007: Red Bull BC One
2001: France MovesTeaching'''
DanceKool
Street Dance Kemp Europe
Urban Dance Camp
Broadway Dance Center
Ones to Watch
International Dance Festival Birmingham
Giant Studio
The Hip Drop Dance Complex
Urban Dance Studio
Fair Play Academy

Training 
Salah specializes in hip-hop, but he has also studied other forms of dance including African, salsa, tap, contemporary, and belly dancing. Salah is a member of Vagabonds and Massive Monkees b-boy crews and Montalvo-Hervieu contemporary dance company. To stay in shape, he works out five times a week with two trainers.

Notes

References

External links 

1979 births
Got Talent winners
Living people
Popping dancers
Breakdancers
French male dancers
French people of Algerian descent
French people of Moroccan descent
Hip hop dancers